Bonny Khalwale is a Kenyan politician, the current Senator for Kakamega County and a former medical doctor.

Personal details

Khalwale, was chairman of the Parliamentary Accounts Committee in the 9th Kenyan Parliament, where he made a reputation for leading censure motions against high profile cabinet ministers. He was appointed on a similar role in the 10th Kenyan Parliament.

He was educated at Musingu High school before proceeding to Kakamega School for his A levels. He graduated from The University of Nairobi  with a degree in Medicine in 1987.

Politics

He first ventured into politics in 2002 by winning the Ikolomani Constituency Parliamentary Seat on a NARC party ticket. In 2007, he retained the same seat on a New Ford Kenya party ticket.

His election as an MP in the 2007 Kenyan parliamentary election was nullified in February 2011. Dr Bonny Khalwale won back his Ikolomani seat on 23 May 2011, beating off a strong challenge from the Orange Democratic Movement, the dominant party in the region.

Voters in Ikolomani handed New Ford Kenya’s Dr Khalwale 13,208 votes, followed closely by Mr Bernard Shinali of ODM with 10,702.
Ford People’s Collins Matemba came a distant third with 293 votes. A total of 24,592 voters out of the registered 35,833 voted in the 63 polling stations in a by-election were seen as a fight between ODM and New Ford-K.

The victory for the man, popularly referred to as the bullfighter, over Mr Shinali, whom he defeated with a slim margin of 200 votes in the 2007 elections, must came in the wake of high-profile campaigns mounted by the then ODM leadership led by Deputy Prime Minister Musalia Mudavadi.

The defeat was seen as a blow not only to Mr Mudavadi but also ODM which was restamping its authority in the region where it has more MPs than any other, and as a boost to the presidential ambitions of Saboti MP Eugene Wamalwa who along with Housing minister Soita Shitanda for the New Ford-K candidate. The by-election was unique in that it attracted leaders Cyrus Jirongo, Mukhisa Kituyi (from Western, Martha Karua and Peter Kenneth from Mount Kenya region to campaign for him. The group were seen to have come together based on their political activism relationship.

In 2012, he comfortably contested and won the Kakamega Senatorial seat on a UDF Party ticket garnering 248,888 votes seeing off a lesser challenge from the wealthy and flamboyant Lugari politician Cyrus Jirongo who got 145,736 votes.

Gubernatorial interest

In March, he publicly declared his interest to vie for the Kakamega sub-chief Seat on a Ford Kenya Party ticket. The seat is currently held by Mr Wycliffe Oparanya of ODM. His home sub county of Ikolomani neighbours the populous sub counties of Shinyalu and Lurambi; a factor that is assessed to give him a head-start in the contest. In addition to the widespread support, he is a good public speaker and as such, many people in Kenya have come to love his activism role. He also commands a wide network of women in the county due to his love for bullfighting sport and the fact that the educated youth feel unfavorably left out in the county government appointments. These factors and bearing in mind that the incumbent is a deputy ODM party leader and a close ally of his earthquakeness, Jakom Baba Raila Odinga (who still harbours presidential ambitions) have left some political analysts predicting a tough village elder contest. Mr. Oparanya has won the hearts of many electorates since being MP for initiating several projects that uplift the lives of the common mwanachi. However his critics says he has somehow adopted a tribal line in the allocation of county resources and employment slots. For example he has been accused of undermining people from the upper part of the county, comprising Lurambi, Ikolomani, Shinyalu, Malava, Lugari and Likuyani.

References

External links
 Bonny Khalwale Official Website

Living people
Members of the Senate of Kenya
Members of the National Assembly (Kenya)
Forum for the Restoration of Democracy – Kenya politicians
Kenyan Luhya people
Alumni of Kakamega School
1960 births
United Democratic Forum Party politicians